NGC 232 is a spiral galaxy located in the constellation Cetus. It was discovered in 1886 by Francis Leavenworth.

References

External links
 

0232
Barred spiral galaxies
Cetus (constellation)
002559